St Mary the Virgin's Church, Weston-on-Trent is a  Grade I listed parish church in the Church of England in Weston-on-Trent, Derbyshire.

History

The church dates from the 13th century the chancel dates from the 12th century with the windows in the north aisle dating from the 14th. Many of the interior features date from the 17th century with a pulpit dated 1611 and a large and unusual monument to Richard Sale dated 1615. 

The parish bier and the chest are dated 1653 and 1662 respectively. It was restored between 1876 and 1877 by Jolley and Evans of Nottingham. The walls had the plaster scraped from them, and the chancel was laid with encaustic tiles. It was fitted with new open oak seating. The contractor was Bullock and Barton of Melbourne. The church reopened on 30 July 1877

Parish status
The church is in a joint parish with 
All Saints’ Church, Aston-upon-Trent
St Wilfrid's Church, Barrow-upon-Trent
St Andrew’s Church, Twyford
St Bartholomew’s Church, Elvaston
St James Church, Shardlow
St James’ Church, Swarkestone

Organ

The church contains a pipe organ by Joseph Walker dating from 1816 which was formerly in All Saints’ Church, Aston-on-Trent. It was moved here in 1974 by H Cantrill. A specification of the organ can be found on the National Pipe Organ Register.

See also
Grade I listed churches in Derbyshire
Grade I listed buildings in Derbyshire
Listed buildings in Weston-on-Trent

References

Church of England church buildings in Derbyshire
Grade I listed churches in Derbyshire